Thomas Nolsøe Danielsen (born 24 June 1983 in Fjerritslev) is a Danish politician who has been serving as Minister for Transport since December 2022. He is also a member of the Folketing for the Venstre political party, elected into parliament at the 2011 Danish general election.

Early life and career

Danielsen trained as a heavy goods vehicle mechanic with Iveco in 2004 and later trained as a banking consultant in 2009. He worked at Sparekassen Holstebro from 2009 until 2011 before being elected to parliament.

Political career
Danielsen was a member of the municipal council of Holstebro Municipality from 2006 to 2013.

Danielsen was first elected into parliament at the 2011 Danish general election, receiving 5,873 votes. He was reelected in 2015 with 8,922 votes and in 2019 with 8,826 votes.

References

External links 
 Biography on the website of the Danish Parliament (Folketinget)

Living people
1983 births
People from Jammerbugt Municipality
Venstre (Denmark) politicians
Danish municipal councillors
Members of the Folketing 2011–2015
Members of the Folketing 2015–2019
Members of the Folketing 2019–2022
Members of the Folketing 2022–2026